The Leaf River Bridge was constructed in 1907 and spans the Leaf River in Greene County, Mississippi. When a new bridge was constructed across the Leaf River on a county road (old Mississippi Highway 24) north of McLain, the old bridge was removed from service and access was terminated. The 1907 bridge was declared a Mississippi Landmark in 1987 and was added to the National Register of Historic Places in 1988.

Description
The  bridge was constructed with a single Pennsylvania through truss span that measures  in length.

References

External links
 Mississippi Historic Bridge Survey (Leaf River Bridge with photographs)

Road bridges on the National Register of Historic Places in Mississippi
Bridges completed in 1907
National Register of Historic Places in Greene County, Mississippi
Pennsylvania truss bridges in the United States
Metal bridges in the United States
Mississippi Landmarks